Asota dohertyi is a moth of the family Erebidae first described by Walter Rothschild in 1897. It is found on Sulawesi.

References

Asota (moth)
Moths of Indonesia
Moths described in 1897